Hubert Hugo (circa 1618 – 1678) was a merchant in Dutch Suratte, a privateer on the Red Sea, and governor of Dutch Mauritius from 1672 to 1677. In 1674 he became one of the last people to document the presence of the dodo on Mauritius.

Life
Hugo was born in Delft. In 1639 he joined the Dutch East India Company (commonly abbreviated to VOC). Around 1641 he arrived in Batavia and soon he was appointed in Dutch Suratte. There he was stationed twelve years. In 1654 he returned to the Dutch Republic as a vice-admiral.

Via Torbay, and Madagascar he arrived at Mocha in the Red Sea and succeeded to capture four Arab ships. In 1662  on his way to France, he paid a visit to Mauritius. There 34 Dutch sailors from the sunk ship  joined him. He promised to drop them on Saint Helena, but the sailors decided not to leave and Hugo sailed to the West-Indies. In 1665 he seems to have been back in the Red Sea.

In 1671 he wrote a letter to the Lords XVII, the managers of the VOC, and proposed to organize slave trade on India and Africa from Mauritius. They accepted his proposal within a few days, because Wreede, who was drinking too much, had to be replaced. Hugo insisted on becoming independent from the commander on Cape of Good Hope.

Hugo left the Republic in December 1671 with his wife Marie, five children and fifty soldiers. In February 1673 he arrived on Mauritius, unsuccessful in buying slaves on Madagascar. He organized agriculture quickly. In 1674 he became one of the last people to document the existence of the dodo. In a letter to the Cape Commander, Hugo noted that hunters had captured and killed a dodo for him in 1673, and that a recaptured slave had seen a population of dodos earlier in 1674.
 
In September 1677 Isaac Johannes Lamotius arrived on Mauritius to replace Hugo as governor. Hugo left the island and sailed to Batavia.

References

Sources
Stapel, F.W. (1930) Hubert Hugo (Een zeerover in dienst van de Oostindische Compagnie).
Allister Macmillan, Mauritius illustrated: historical and descriptive, commercial and industrial facts, figures, and resources., London : W.H. & L. Collingridge, 1914
 François Leguat, The Voyage of François Leguat of Bresse to Rodriguez, Mauritius, Java, and the Cape of Good Hope, 2010, Cambridge University Press.

Dutch Governors of Mauritius
Year of birth uncertain
1678 deaths